Arlington Plantation or Arlington Plantation House may refer to:

United States 
 Arlington Plantation House (Franklin, Louisiana), listed on the National Register of Historic Places (NRHP) in St. Mary Parish
 Arlington Plantation (Lake Providence, Louisiana), NRHP-listed in East Carroll Parish
 Arlington Plantation House (Washington, Louisiana), NRHP-listed in St. Landry Parish
 Arlington Antebellum Home & Gardens (Birmingham, Alabama), listed on the National Register of Historic Places (NRHP)

See also
Arlington (disambiguation)